Lars Markmanrud (born 1 March 2001) is a Norwegian football defender who plays for Sandefjord.

Starting his career in local Sandefjord club Store Bergan IL, he joined Sandefjord Fotball's junior setup in 2017. He was promoted to the senior squad in 2020 and made his Eliteserien debut in June 2020 against Odd.

References

2001 births
Living people
People from Sandefjord
Norwegian footballers
Sandefjord Fotball players
Eliteserien players
Association football defenders
Sportspeople from Vestfold og Telemark